Larry R. Johannessen (1947–2009) was an American educator, academic, and author.

Early life and military service
Johannessen was born and raised in Denver, Colorado. When he went to register for classes in high school, his counselor scheduled him into the vocational curriculum based on his address in the working class section of his community. Johannessen elected to leave high school before graduating and enlisted in the U.S. Marines Corps, joining the same unit in which his father had served: B (Bravo) Company, 1st Reconnaissance Battalion, 1st Marine Division. Johannessen served two tours of duty in Vietnam. As a Marine, he was awarded the Presidential Unit Citation with one star, the National Defense Service Medal, the Vietnam Campaign Medal, the Vietnam Service Medal with three stars, the Good Conduct Medal, and the Rifle Marksman Badge (1964–68). He left the service with an honorable discharge in 1968 at the rank of Sergeant.

Education
Upon leaving the Marines, Johannessen earned his G.E.D. and entered Ohlone College, a two-year college in Fremont, California, from which he graduated with an A.A. with honors in 1973. He transferred to California State University, Hayward (now East Bay), receiving his B.A. in 1975, graduating magna cum laude. From there Johannessen earned his M.A.T. in 1976 in English Education from the University of Chicago, the program run by George Hillocks, Jr. At the University of Chicago, he met Elizabeth (Betsy) Kahn, whom he married. They had been married for 27 years at the time of Johannessen's death. Johannessen began working on his doctoral studies in 1983 at the University of Chicago, again under the mentorship of Hillocks. He completed his degree in 1997.

Career
Johannessen taught high school English at Lyons Township High School in La Grange, Illinois, from 1976 to 1989. While a doctoral student he began teaching at universities, including Saint Xavier University in Chicago, Benedictine University in Lisle, IL, and Barat College in Lake Forest, IL. In 2001 he became an assistant professor of English at Northern Illinois University. During his career at NIU, he served as Director of Undergraduate Studies and was promoted to the rank of full professor in 2007.

Johannessen died on April 21, 2009, at Rush University Medical Center in Chicago, of complications related to a blood disorder, myelodysplastic syndrome.

Awards
Johannessen's academic career produced a number of awards. From NCTE he won the 2006 Richard A. Meade award and the Edwin M. Hopkins Award. His was the recipient of the 2003 Illinois Association for Supervision and Curriculum Development Winn Research Award. Northern Illinois University named him the 2007 NIU Ally Award, presented to individuals who have done something positive for Lesbian, Gay, Bisexual, Transgender Community at NIU, and presented him with the College of Liberal Arts and Sciences 2005–06 Long-Term Merit/Critical Retention Award. In 1973 he was named the Outstanding Ohlone College English Student Award, and in 1990 was honored with an Ohlone College Outstanding Alumnus award. The Illinois Institute of Technology honored him with a Distinguished High School Teachers of the Chicago Area Award in 1981.

Publications
Johannessen was a prolific author and presenter. His writing was published in a variety of journals, including English Journal, The Clearing House, Research in the Teaching of English, The Social Studies, and other journals. He was also the author, co-author, or co-editor of nine books published by Heinemann, NCTE, and Merrill, plus two textbooks on vocabulary study for Kendall/Hunt. His work fell into three general areas: teaching the literature of the Vietnam War, designing instruction using a structured process approach, and the experiences of beginning English teachers. Many of these publications were coauthored with his wife, Elizabeth Kahn, and his close friend Tom McCann.

His books and monographs include:
 Smagorinsky, P., Johannessen, L. R., Kahn, E. A., & McCann, T. M. (2010). The Dynamics of Writing Instruction:  A Structured Process Approach for the Composition Teacher in the Middle and High School.  Portsmouth, NH:  Heinemann.
 Kahn, E.A., Walter, C.C., &  Johannessen, L.R. (2009). Writing about Literature, 2nd Edition.  Urbana, IL:  National Council of Teachers of English.
 McCann, T.M., Johannessen, L.R., Kahn, E.A., & Flanagan, J. (2006). Talking in Class: Using Discussion to Enhance Teaching and Learning.  Urbana, IL:  National Council of Teachers of English.
 McCann, T.M., Johannessen, L.R., & Ricca, B. (2005). Supporting Beginning English Teachers:  Research and Implications for Teacher Induction.  Urbana, IL:  National Council of Teachers of English.
 McCann, T.M., Johannessen, L.R., Kahn, E.A., Smagorinsky, P., & Smith, M.W. (Eds.)(2005). Reflective Teaching, Reflective Learning:  How to Develop Engaged Readers, Writers, and Speakers.  Portsmouth, NH: Heinemann.
 Johannessen, L. R., & McCann, T.M. (2002). In Case You Teach English:  An Interactive Casebook for Prospective and Practicing English Teachers. Upper Saddle River, NJ:  Merrill Education/Prentice Hall.
 Johannessen, L. R. (1992). Illumination Rounds:  Teaching the Literature of the Vietnam War.  Urbana, IL:  National Council of Teachers of English.
Johannessen, L. R., & Scruggs, A. (1986). Steps to a Better Vocabulary: Developmental, 3rd Edition. Dubuque, Iowa:  Kendall/Hunt Publishing Co.
Johannessen, L. R., & Scruggs, A. (1986). Steps to a Better Vocabulary: Advanced, 3rd Edition.  Dubuque, Iowa:  Kendall/Hunt Publishing Co.
 Kahn, E., Walter, C. C., & Johannessen, L., (1984). Writing about Literature.  Urbana, IL:  National Council of Teachers of English.
 Johannessen, L., Kahn, E., & Walter, C. C. (1982).  Designing and Sequencing Prewriting Activities.  Urbana, IL:  National Council of Teachers of English.

External links
  Larry R. Johannessen, 1947–2009: Teacher's teacher shared lessons of Vietnam War
  NIU mourns loss of Professor Larry Johannessen
  Campus mourns death of Larry Johannessen

20th-century American educators
1947 births
Ohlone College alumni
University of Chicago alumni
Benedictine University faculty
Northern Illinois University faculty
2009 deaths
California State University, East Bay alumni